Andrew Osmond (born 4 March 1967) is a contemporary British novelist.

Literary career 
Osmond is the author of cult fiction titles such as Big Fish (2004), High (2004) and Young British Slacker (2006). Big Fish was described by Spike as a must read for wannabe globe-trotters, armchair travellers and mystery fans, alike. Midwest Book Reviews said of Young British Slacker: "...compels the readers' attention with its unique writing style and tactile-perfect realism in its stream of consciousness thoughts and emotions of a wage slave."

References 

21st-century British novelists
English mystery writers
Living people
1967 births
British male novelists
21st-century English male writers